Héctor Velázquez Moreno (born Mexico City, 1922 – died 2006) was a Mexican architect.

Biography 
Velázquez studied at the Faculty of Architecture of the Universidad Nacional Autónoma de México (UNAM) after 1949, and afterwards at Harvard University and at the Massachusetts Institute of Technology. Due to a scholarship he was enabled to visit also the École nationale supérieure des Beaux-Arts in Paris.

In the 1950s, he designed together with notable architects the Ciudad Universitaria of the UNAM. He designed several religious buildings as well as accommodation and commercial buildings, also in other countries He co-designed the 1957 Plaza Jacaranda shopping center in the Zona Rosa, Mexico City, a hub for the city's fashion-conscious and artist scenes.

He was president of the Colegio de Arquitectos de la Ciudad de México (CAM) in the Sociedad de Arquitectos de México from  1963 to 1965. He was head of social housebuilding in the Distrito Federal de México, director of architecture and urban planning in the Secretaría de Obras Públicas and general commissioner of construction and redevelopment at the UNAM.

Together with Ramón Torres Martínez he founded the architecture bureau Torres y Velázquez Arquitectos y Asociados, and was co-founder of the Despacho de Arquitectos HV. S.A. de C.V. in 1990.

External links 
 
 Website of Héctor Velázquez Moreno

References and notes 

Mexican architects
Artists from Mexico City
National Autonomous University of Mexico alumni
Harvard University alumni
Massachusetts Institute of Technology alumni
1922 births
2006 deaths
Mexican expatriates in the United States